(in ) is a story from Russian folklore about an allegedly true event involving a meeting with spirits. In contrast to the byvalschina, here the story is conducted with an emphasis on the personal testimony of the narrator.

See also

 Byvalschina

References

Померанцева Э. В. Мифологические персонажи в русском фольклоре. М., 1975. — С. 16-18.
Зиновьев В. П. Быличка как жанр фольклора и её современные судьбы // Мифологические рассказы русского населения Восточной Сибири. — Новосибирск, 1987. — С. 381—383.

Russian folklore